Randolph Healy (born 1956) is an Irish poet and publisher.

Healy was born in Scotland and moved to Dublin at the age of  18 months. After leaving school at the age of 14 to work in a number of jobs, he returned to full-time education and graduated in mathematical sciences from  Trinity College, Dublin. He now works as a teacher of mathematics at second level. His poetry is marked by the frequent use of structural devices derived from logic and scientific diction and information.

Like many Irish poets, he has written work that touches on issues of the politics of language.  He is unique, though, in that he takes sign language and deafness as his points of departure in addressing these matters.

His books include 25 Poems (1983),  Rana Rana! (1997).  Arbor Vitae (1997), Flame (1998) and Selected Poems (2000). He runs the publishing house Wild Honey Press.

External links
An interview with Randolph Healy
Wild Honey Press

1956 births
Irish poets
Irish modernist poets
Living people